Steganosticha is a genus of moths of the family Yponomeutidae.

Species
Steganosticha remigera - Meyrick, 1921 

Yponomeutidae